George Maddison (died 1783) was a British politician and joint Parliamentary Under-Secretary of State for Foreign Affairs 1782–83. It is thought that he was born at Hole House, Edmundbyers, in the parish of Lanchester in County Durham. He died suddenly in Paris on 27 Aug 1783, suspected to have been poisoned.

His brother John (died 24 Oct 1808, age 65) held diplomatic positions, including in the receiver general's office in the Post Office in 1766 and secretary for the foreign department 11 July 1787.

Career
The Parliamentary Under-Secretary of State for Foreign Affairs has been a junior position in the British government since 1782, subordinate to the Secretary of State for Foreign Affairs. Maddison held this position (jointly with William Fraser) from 1782 to 1783. He was the second (joint) holder of the position.

Maddison held various government diplomatic positions, and while serving as Under-Secretary received a promotion on 2 April 1783 to Secretary to the Extraordinary Embassy to his most Christian Majesty. He received an allowance of £300 for his equipage and 40 shillings (£2) a day for his ordinary entertainment.

Ode to the River Derwent
Maddison was mentioned in "Ode to the River Derwent", a poem of some 40 verses  by John Carr, which appeared in The Bishoprick Garland of 1834  by Sir Cuthbert Sharp.

The last four lines of the poem are as follows:

Say, when will thou cease to complain?
Oh, Derwent! thy destiny cries:
Far off, on the banks of the Seine,
Thy darling, thy Maddison dies!

and are inscribed on his monument.

See also
 Geordie dialect words

References

External links
 The Bishoprick Garland

1783 deaths
Ambassadors of the United Kingdom to France
Geordie songwriters
Year of birth unknown
People from Lanchester, County Durham